The 2015 Three Days of De Panne was the 39th edition of the Three Days of De Panne cycling stage race. It took place around De Panne in West Flanders in the week between Gent–Wevelgem and the Tour of Flanders, beginning on 31 March and ending on 2 April. The race included four stages, two of which took place on the final day. It was rated as a 2.1 event in the 2015 UCI Europe Tour. The defending champion was Guillaume Van Keirsbulck, who won the 2014 edition by seven seconds.

The 2015 edition was won by Alexander Kristoff, who won the first three stages and came third in the final time trial. He also won the points classification. In second place was Stijn Devolder. Third was Bradley Wiggins, who won the individual time trial on the final day.

Teams 
25 teams were selected to take part in the 2015 Three Days of De Panne. 11 of these were UCI WorldTeams, 11 were UCI Professional Continental teams and the remaining 3 were Belgian UCI Continental teams.

Route 
The race included four stages: the first three of these were road stages, while the fourth was an individual time trial.

Stages

Stage 1 
31 March 2015 — De Panne to Zottegem,

Stage 2 
1 April 2015 — Zottegem to Koksijde,

Stage 3a 
2 April 2015 — De Panne to De Panne,

Stage 3b 
2 April 2015 — De Panne to Koksijde to De Panne, individual time trial (ITT)

Classification leadership table

References

External links 

 

Three Days of De Panne
Three Days of De Panne
Three Days of Bruges–De Panne